Bélgica Castro Sierra (6 March 1921 – 6 March 2020) was a Chilean stage, film, and television actress.

During her career she participated in more than 100 plays. She also acted in numerous Chilean films, including  (1944) by Jorge Délano and The Good Life (2008) by Andrés Wood. Under the direction of Ricardo Larraín she participated in Chile puede (2008), where she played a Russian scientist, a role for which she received the Paoa Award of the Viña del Mar International Film Festival for Best National Lead Actress and the APES Award for Best Supporting Actress. She also won the 1995 National Prize for Performing and Audiovisual Arts.

Biography
Bélgica Castro, the daughter of Spanish anarchist parents, was born in Concepción and studied in Temuco. Hired by the BBC, she spent 1949 in London.

Having retired from the Theater of the University of Chile, she and Alejandro Sieveking formed their own company, El Teatro del Ángel. Subsequently, from 1974 until the end of 1984, they settled in Costa Rica, where she also achieved notable successes with the same company.

She was a teacher of the history of theater at the University of Chile's Theater School for 14 years, and of acting at the Theater School of the Catholic University of Chile and at the University of Costa Rica.

In 1995, she was awarded the National Prize for Performing and Audiovisual Arts. In 2007 she was nominated for the Altazor Award for Best Actress in Theater for her role in the play Cabeza de ovni, and won it in 2013 for Todo pasajero debe descender.

Under the direction of Ricardo Larraín she participated in Chile puede (2008), where she played a Russian scientist, a role for which she received the Paoa Award of the Viña del Mar International Film Festival for Best National Lead Actress and the APES Award for Best Supporting Actress.

For her role in the film , the debut of director Sebastián Silva, she won the 2008 Altazor Award for National Arts in the category Best Film Actress. In 2009, she received the same award for her role in Andrés Wood's The Good Life. In 2010, she returned to the big screen in the Sebastián Silva film Old Cats, along with her husband Alejandro Sieveking, Claudia Celedón, and Catalina Saavedra. Her lead role earned her the Best Actress award at the 16th Festivalisimo, the Ibero-Latin American Film Festival of Montreal, and a third Altazor for film acting.

Castro died on 6 March 2020, her 99th birthday, which fell one day after the death of her husband Alejandro Sieveking, who died at age 85 on 5 March.

Filmography

Film
  (1944)
 El final del juego (1970)
 Little White Dove (1973) – Abuela
 Sin ceder (1998)
  (1998) 
  (1999) – Margarita
 Days in the Country (2004) – Paulita
  (2007)
 Chile puede (2008)
 The Good Life (2008)
 Old Cats (2010) – Isidora
 Viejos amores (2016) – Herself

Television
 
  (1972) – Eduviges
 La Recta Provincia (2007) – Rosalba
 Litoral (2008) – Señora

Awards

APES Awards

Altazor Awards

Other awards
 1995, National Prize for Performing and Audiovisual Arts
 1999, Rectoral Distinction Medal of the University of Chile
 2002, Professor Pedro de la Barra Distinction Medal of Cultural Merit
 2008, Viña del Mar International Film Festival Paoa Award
 2010, Pedro Sienna Award for Best Lead Actress in Old Cats 
 2015, UMCE Armando Rubio Culture Prize
 2016,  Award for Best National Career 
 2016, Pablo Neruda Order of Artistic and Cultural Merit
 2017, Distinguished Public Person Medal from the Municipality of Providencia

References

External links
 

1921 births
Chilean film actresses
Chilean people of Spanish descent
Chilean stage actresses
Chilean theatre directors
2020 deaths
People from Concepción, Chile
Academic staff of the Pontifical Catholic University of Chile
University of Chile alumni
Academic staff of the University of Chile
Academic staff of the University of Costa Rica
Women theatre directors
20th-century Chilean actresses
21st-century Chilean actresses